Channel 2 or TV 2 may refer to:

Television networks, channels and stations

Channel 2 (Iran), operated by Islamic Republic of Iran Broadcasting
Channel 2 (Israel), a commercial television station
, entertainment and music television in Latvia
Channel 2 (Syria), a terrestrial broadcaster
TV 2 (Denmark), a publicly owned station
TV2 (Hungarian TV channel), a commercial station
TV2 (Malaysian TV network), a government-operated network
TV 2 (Norway), a commercial station
TV2 (Virgin Islands), a CBS-affiliated cable channel
Castilla–La Mancha TV 2, Spain
France 2, a public television channel in France
La 2 (Spanish TV channel), a Spanish television channel operated by RTVE
2DF (TV), a public television channel in Germany
Yle TV2, a Finnish television channel operated by Yle
ABC2, a national public television channel in Australia
América 2 or Canal 2, a commercial station in Buenos Aires, Argentina
BBC Two, a public television channel in the United Kingdom
bTV Action or TV2, a commercial station in Bulgaria
Canal+ 2, a subscription television channel in Spain
Canal Nou Dos, a channel in Spain which broadcasts in Valencian
CHEX-TV-2, a privately owned station in Durham Region, Ontario, Canada
Conexión TV Canal 2, a privately owned station in Costa Rica
Channel 2 (El Salvador), a television channel owned by Telecorporación Salvadoreña.
DWWX-TV, the flagship television station of ABS-CBN Corporation in the Philippines
DZMV-TV, commonly known as Channel 2, the flagship television station of the Advanced Media Broadcasting System in the Philippines, formerly DWWX-TV of ABS-CBN
Frecuencia Latina or Frecuencia 2, a commercial televisión station in Lima, Perú
Kanal 2, a privately owned station in Estonia
KBS2, an entertainment channel in South Korea
Noticias PY, formely Red Guarani, a Paraguayan free-to-air television channel 
NPO 2, a public television channel in the Nederlands, formerly known as TV2
TVN (Panamanian TV network), a commercial television station in Panama
Rai 2, a public television channel in Italy
RTÉ2, a public television channel in Ireland
RTP2 or TV2, a public broadcast station in Portugal 
SABC 2 or TV2, a state-owned channel in South Africa
Stöð 2, a privately owned station in Iceland
SVT2, until 1996 TV2, second television channel of Sveriges Television in Sweden
Televicentro (Canal 2), a nationwide terrestrial channel in Nicaragua
Tele Antillas Canal 2, a privately owned station in the Dominican Republic
Telecanal, a private television channel
Teve2, a commercial station in Turkey owned by Doğan Media Group, formerly known as TV2
TVNZ 2 (formerly TV2), New Zealand
Unitel Bolivia a commercial television station in Bolivia
Las Estrellas, a Mexican commercial television network assigned virtual channel 2 nationwide
WCBS-TV Channel 2, a CBS-affiliated station in New York. United States

Other uses
TV-2 (band), a Danish pop-rock group
TV 2 Group, Norwegian media company
Train Valley 2, a 2018 video game sometimes referred to as TV2
Lockheed TV-2 Seastar, an American jet trainer aircraft
2channel, a Japanese Internet forum sometimes referred to as "Channel 2"
2TV, an Irish music programme broadcast on Network 2 television, 1995–2001

See also
Lists of television channels
Channel 2 branded TV stations in the United States
 Channel 2 virtual TV stations in Canada
 Channel 2 virtual TV stations in the United States

For VHF frequencies covering 54-60 MHz:
 Channel 2 TV stations in Canada
 Channel 2 TV stations in Mexico
 Channel 2 digital TV stations in the United States
 Channel 2 low-power TV stations in the United States

02